Mike Muller (born September 18, 1971) is an American ice hockey coach and a retired ice hockey defenseman. , he is the head coach of the Minnesota Loons junior hockey team in the North American 3 Hockey League.

Playing career

United States 
He was drafted in the 2nd round of the 1990 NHL Entry Draft by the Winnipeg Jets out of Wayzata High School in Plymouth, Minnesota and played for the University of Minnesota between 1990 und 1992.

Russia 
Muller started his professional career in the 1992–93 season playing eleven games for HC Moscow Dynamo of the Russian International Hockey League. He was the first foreign hockey player in the Russian International Hockey League, in which he was a member of the championship team in the 1992–93 season.

Germany 
Until 1997, he played in the AHL, IHL and ECHL, before moving to Germany. Muller represented several second- and third-division teams from Germany, including EHC Neuwied, Iserlohner EC, Bietigheim Steelers, Moskitos Essen, EV Ravensburg and EHF Passau Black Hawks. He retired from playing after the 2009–10 season.

Coaching career 
In his early coaching career, Muller worked at the youth level, coaching the under-20 squad of Italian club HC Eppan in 2011–12. He then returned to Ravensburg, where he had spent three years as a player, taking over as youth coach while also serving as assistant on the club's men's team in the second German division.

Prior to the 2015–16 season, Muller was appointed head coach of ESV Kaufbeuren, a member of Germany's second-tier DEL2. In December 2015, he signed a contract extension through the 2016–17 season. On February 16, 2016, Muller was fired by ESV Kaufbeuren after a series of two wins and 13 losses since the beginning of the new year.

In March 2019, Muller was announced as the head coach of the Breezy Point North Stars of the North American 3 Hockey League (NA3HL). The team ceased operations after his first season. When the franchise was re-activated as the Minnesota Loons in 2021, he was brought back as head coach.

Career statistics

References

External links

Minnesota Golden Gophers men's ice hockey players
HC Dynamo Moscow players
Moncton Hawks players
Springfield Falcons players
Minnesota Moose players
Grand Rapids Griffins (IHL) players
Mississippi Sea Wolves players
Baton Rouge Kingfish players
Rockford IceHogs (UHL) players
Essen Mosquitoes players
EHF Passau Black Hawks players
Ravensburg Towerstars players
SC Bietigheim-Bissingen players
EHC Neuwied players
Iserlohn Roosters players
Winnipeg Jets (1979–1996) draft picks
Ice hockey coaches from Minnesota
Living people
1971 births
Ice hockey coaches
American ice hockey coaches
American men's ice hockey defensemen
Ice hockey players from Minnesota